Marika Savšek (born c. 1986) is a Slovenian beauty pageant titleholder who was crowned  and represented her country in Miss Universe 2010.

Early life
Born in Šmartno pri Litiji, Savšek grew up with brothers Andrej, Janez; and sister Ana. Prior to competing in Miss Universe Slovenia, she was a member of France Marolt Academic Folklore Group.

Miss Universe Slovenia 2010
Savšek competed as Miss Litija in her country's national beauty pageant Miss Universe Slovenije, held in Ljubljana on May 14, 2010, initially placing second runner-up to Sandra Marinovič of Trbovlje.

Three days later, an accounting error was revealed to the press, in which the names of the winner and her two runners-up were read in reverse order, meaning Savšek was the rightful Miss Universe Slovenia 2010. She was crowned on May 17, gaining the right to represent her country in Miss Universe 2010.

Miss Universe 2010
As the official representative of her country to the 2010 Miss Universe pageant broadcast live from Las Vegas, Nevada on August 23, Savšek participated as one of the 83 delegates who vied for the crown of eventual winner, Ximena Navarrete of Mexico.

References

External links
Official Miss Universe Slovenije website

1986 births
Living people
Miss Universe 2010 contestants
Slovenian beauty pageant winners
People from the Municipality of Šmartno pri Litiji
Slovenian female models